The Yuqui are an indigenous people of Bolivia. They primarily live in the Santa Cruz and Cochabamba Departments of eastern Bolivia.

Name
"Yuqui" has been used by Spanish-speakers since the colonial period. A possibility is the word derived from "Yaqui," meaning "younger relative." Their autonym is "Mbia," a Tupi-Guaraní term means "the people." They are also known as the Bia, Yuki, Yukí, or Yuquí people.

Language
The Yuqui language is a Guarayú language of the Tupí-Guaraní language family, written in the Latin script. The Bible was partially translated into Yuqui in 2000.

History
Their first Spanish contact was in 1548. Linguists believe that Yuqui people may have separated from the Siriono people in the 17th century. According to their own history, Yuqui people experienced disease contracted from and warfare with local Bolivians. In the 1950s the Bolivian government came into conflict with Yuqui people.

Outsiders thought that Yuqui people were part of the Siriono people; however, after sustained contact in the 1960s, a Siriono language-speaker attempted to communicate to Yuquis and discovered they were a distinct ethnic group. In 1953, there were only 43 Yuquis, while in 1990, there were 130.

Subsistence
Yuqui traditionally have been nomadic and fished, hunted, and foraged instead of farming. Today they hunt fish, farm, sell crafts, and work as paid laborers.

See also
 Yuki-Ichilo River Native Community Lands

References

References
 Olson, James Stuart. The Indians of Central and South America: An Ethnohistorical Dictionary. Greenwood Publishing Group, 1991. .

Indigenous peoples in Bolivia
Indigenous peoples of the Amazon
Cochabamba Department
Santa Cruz Department (Bolivia)